Strange Adventures is a series of American comic books published by DC Comics, the first of which was August–September 1950, according to the cover date, and published continuously until November 1973.

Original series
Strange Adventures ran for 244 issues and was DC Comics' first science fiction title.  It began with an adaptation of the film Destination Moon. The sales success of the gorilla cover-featured story in Strange Adventures #8 (May 1951) led DC to produce numerous comic book covers with depictions of gorillas. The series was home to one of the last superheroes of the pre-Silver Age of Comic Books era, Captain Comet, created by writer John Broome and artist Carmine Infantino in issue #9. A combination of the "Captain Comet" feature with the "gorilla craze" was presented in issue #39 (December 1953). Other notable series included Star Hawkins which began in issue #114 (March 1960) and the Atomic Knights which debuted in issue #117 (June 1960).

In "The Strange Adventure That Really Happened" in issue #140 (May 1962), real life comics creators editor Julius Schwartz and artist Sid Greene struggle to make writer Gardner Fox recall a story he has written that holds the key to saving the Earth from alien invasion. In a rare acknowledgement of the rest of the DC universe in Strange Adventures, one panel mentions Gardner Fox having previously met the Flash in the iconic Silver Age story "Flash of Two Worlds".

Strange Adventures #180 (September 1965) introduced Animal Man in a story by Dave Wood and Carmine Infantino. The character was revived by writer Grant Morrison in 1988. Writer Bob Haney and artist Howard Purcell created the supernatural character the Enchantress in Strange Adventures #187 (April 1966). The Enchantress appears in the 2016 live-action movie Suicide Squad, portrayed by Cara Delevingne.

Initially a science fiction anthology title with some continuing features starring SF protagonists, the series became a supernatural-fantasy title beginning with issue #202, for which it received a new logo. Deadman's first appearance in Strange Adventures #205, written by Arnold Drake and drawn by Carmine Infantino, included the first known depiction of narcotics in a story approved by the Comics Code Authority. The "Deadman" feature served as an early showcase for the artwork of Neal Adams.

With issue #217, the title gained another new logo and began reprinting stories of Adam Strange and the Atomic Knights, among other stories. Several Strange Adventure stories were also reprinted in some of DC Comics' later anthologies such as From Beyond the Unknown.

In 1978, DC Comics intended to revive Strange Adventures. These plans were put on hold that year due to the DC Implosion, a line-wide scaling back of the company's publishing output. When the project was revived a year later, the title was changed to Time Warp and the series was in the Dollar Comics format.

Publication history
Continuing features in Strange Adventures included:
 Chris KL-99 (issues #1–3, 5, 7, 9, 11, 15)
 Darwin Jones (issues #1, 48, 58, 66, 70, 76, 77, 79, 84, 88, 93, 149, 160)
 Captain Comet (issues #9–44, 46, 49) (cover feature many times)
 Space Museum (issues #104, 106, 109, 112, 115, 118, 121, 124, 127, 130, 133, 136, 139, 142, 145, 148, 151, 154, 157, 161)
 Star Hawkins (issues #114, 119, 122, 125, 128, 131, 134, 137, 140, 143, 146, 149, 152, 155, 158, 162, 173, 176, 179, 182, 185)
 Atomic Knights (issues #117, 120, 123, 126, 129, 132, 135, 138, 141, 144, 147, 150, 153, 156, 160, with reprints in 217–231) 
 Faceless Creature from Saturn (issues #124, 142, 153)
 Star Rovers (from Mystery in Space, #issues 159, 163)
 Animal Man (issues #180, 184, 190, 195, 201) 
 Immortal Man (issues #177, 185, 190, 198)
 Enchantress (issues #187, 191, 200) 
 Deadman (issues #205 to 216)
 Adam Strange (reprints in #217 to 244; new stories in #222, 226 and 227 text stories with illustrations)

Awards
The series was nominated and awarded several awards over the years, including Alley Awards in 1963 for "General Fantasy", in 1965 for "Best Regularly Published Fantasy Comic", in 1966 for "Best Fantasy/SF/Supernatural Title", in 1967 for "Best Cover" (for issue #207 by Neal Adams), in 1967 for "Best Full-Length Story" ("Who's Been Lying in My Grave?" in issue #205 by Arnold Drake and Carmine Infantino), and the 1967 for "Best New Strip" ("Deadman" by Drake and Infantino).

Revivals

Vertigo miniseries
In 1999, DC Comics' Vertigo imprint released a four-issue mini-series reviving the Strange Adventures title and concept.

It featured stories written by Brian Azzarello, Brian Bolland, Dave Gibbons, Bruce Jones, Joe R. Lansdale, John Ney Rieber, Robert Rodi, Doselle Young and Mark Schultz. Artists included Edvin Biuković, Richard Corben, Klaus Janson, Frank Quitely, James Romberger, and John Totleben. The miniseries is cover-dated November 1999 to February 2000.

JSA Strange Adventures

In 2004, Strange Adventures was again revived, in modified format, as the six-issue limited series JSA Strange Adventures, which presented a new Golden Age Justice Society of America story incorporating fantasy-fiction themes. It was written by Kevin J. Anderson, with art by Barry Kitson and Gary Erskine. The miniseries is cover-dated October 2004 to March 2005, and was collected in trade paperback in 2010.

Strange Adventures (2009)
Jim Starlin wrote an eight-issue limited series called Strange Adventures which focused on Adam Strange, Bizarro and Captain Comet, which started in May 2009. This series continued the "Aberrant Six" storyline, as well as plot developments from the Rann/Thanagar Holy War and Countdown to Adventure. This series was collected in trade paperback in 2010.

Strange Adventures (2011 Vertigo one-shot)
An 80-page Strange Adventures #1, an anthology one-shot, with short science fiction and fantasy stories was released with a July 2011 cover date. Contributing writers and artists include Peter Milligan, Scott Snyder, Jeff Lemire, Brian Azzarello, Eduardo Risso, Paul Pope, and Paul Cornell.

Strange Adventures (2020 DC Black Label series)  
A new Strange Adventures series was written by Tom King with Mitch Gerads and Doc Shaner. The series was released in March 2020, under the DC Black Label imprint. The limited series ran for 12 issues, ending in October 2021. For the 2022 Hugo Awards, the series received a Best Graphic Story of 2021 nomination.

Collected editions
 Captain Comet Archives Vol. 1 collects Captain Comet stories from Strange Adventures #9–44, 46, and 49, 400 pages, August 2013,  
 Showcase Presents: Strange Adventures Vol. 1 collects Strange Adventures #54–73, 512 pages, December 2008, 
 Showcase Presents: Strange Adventures Vol. 2 collects Strange Adventures #74–93, 520 pages, November 2013, 
The Steve Ditko Omnibus Volume 1 includes Strange Adventures #188: "Don't Bring That Monster to Life" by Otto Binder and Steve Ditko and Strange Adventures #189: "The Way-Out Worlds of Bertram Tilley" by Dave Wood and Ditko, 480 pages, September 2011, 
 DC Goes Ape collects Strange Adventures #201, 168 pages, October 2008, 
 Deadman
 The Deadman Collection hardcover collects Strange Adventures #205–216, 356 pages, December 2001,  
 Deadman Vol. 1 trade paperback collects Strange Adventures #205–213, 176 pages, July 2011,  
 Deadman Vol. 2 trade paperback collects Strange Adventures #214–216, 160 pages, February 2012,  
 JSA: Strange Adventures collects JSA: Strange Adventures #1–6, 200 pages, February 2010,  
 Strange Adventures collects Strange Adventures volume 3 #1–8, 256 pages, April 2010, 
 Adam Strange: The Silver Age Omnibus collects (in addition to Showcase #17–19 and Mystery in Space #53–100, 102) Strange Adventures #157, 217, 218, 220, 221, 222, 224, 226, 235, and 241–243, 848 pages, July 2017,

In other media
In October 2019, WarnerMedia announced that Greg Berlanti, the producer of The CW's Arrowverse, would be producing a new "super hero anthology" under the title Strange Adventures for the streaming service HBO Max. The series had reportedly been in development previously for the DC Universe streaming service. In August 2022, Kevin Smith, who was writing the script with Eric Carrasco, stated that the series had been cancelled.

References

External links 

Strange Adventures at Mike's Amazing World of DC Comics

Comics magazines published in the United States
1950 comics debuts
1973 comics endings
1999 comics debuts
2000 comics endings
2004 comics debuts
2005 comics endings
2009 comics debuts
2009 comics endings
2011 comics debuts
2020 comics debuts
Bimonthly magazines published in the United States
Monthly magazines published in the United States
Comics by Arnold Drake
Comics by Bob Haney
Comics by Gardner Fox
Comics by Neal Adams
Comics by Jim Starlin
DC Comics one-shots
Defunct American comics
Horror comics
Magazines established in 1950
Magazines disestablished in 1973
Magazines established in 1999
Magazines disestablished in 2000
Magazines established in 2004
Magazines disestablished in 2005
Magazines established in 2009
Magazines disestablished in 2009
Magazines established in 2011
Science fiction comics
1950 establishments in the United States